Sweden competed at the 1924 Summer Olympics in Paris, France. 159 competitors, 146 men and 13 women, took part in 84 events in 15 sports.

Medalists

Athletics

Thirty-three athletes represented Sweden in 1924. It was the nation's sixth appearance in the sport as well as the Games. The Swedes took five medals, but none were gold.

Ranks given are within the heat.

Boxing 

Five boxers represented Sweden at the 1924 Games. It was the nation's debut in the sport. Andrén was the most successful, reaching the semifinals and finishing fourth place in the bantamweight division.

Cycling

Four cyclists represented Sweden in 1924. It was the nation's fourth appearance in the sport. The Swedes competed only in the road cycling time trials. Two of the four placed in the top ten, but neither were able to secure a medal. The times of the top three Swedes were good enough to win the team bronze, however, making 1924 the third consecutive Games in which the Swedish road cyclists had won a team medal.

Road cycling

Diving

Eleven divers, seven men and four women, represented Sweden in 1924. It was the nation's fourth appearance in the sport. Despite having 11 of the nation's 14 entries reach the finals (3 divers competed in two events apiece), Sweden finished without a gold medal for the first time in its Olympic diving history. Jansson's silver in the men's plain high diving was the best result of the year, with Töpel adding a bronze medal in the women's platform.

Ranks given are within the heat.

 Men

 Women

Equestrian

Twelve equestrians represented Sweden in 1924; Sweden was one of two nations (along with France) to send the maximum number of riders. It was the nation's third appearance in the sport. Sweden's four medals was twice the number won by any other nation, and Sweden matched the Netherlands for most gold medals at two (a historical low for Sweden, which had taken four gold medals in both 1912 and 1920).

All four of Sweden's dressage competitors finished in the top five, with France's Lesage taking the bronze to break up the Swedish dominance—Sweden had swept the medals in each of the two previous Games. In contrast, König at fifth was the only Swede in the top five of the eventing and no Swedes finished in the top five in jumping (though two came in the top seven). Nevertheless, Sweden took silver in the combined team score for eventing and gold in the jumping team competition.

Fencing

Nine fencers, six men and three women, represented Sweden in 1924. It was the nation's fifth appearance in the sport; Sweden was one of nine nations to send women to the first Olympic women's fencing competition. Hellsten won Sweden's first Olympic fencing medal with the bronze in the épée.

 Men

Ranks given are within the pool.

 Women

Ranks given are within the pool.

Football

Summary

Sweden competed in the Olympic football tournament for the fourth time in 1924. The Swedish side won the nation's first Olympic football medal, with a bronze, by defeating the Netherlands in the bronze medal match (which required a replay after the first match was drawn). The Swedes had reached that point by winning lopsided victories over Belgium, the defending champions, and Egypt before losing a tight match to Switzerland.

 Round 1 Bye

 Round 2

 Quarterfinals

 Semifinals

 Bronze medal match

Modern pentathlon

Four pentathletes represented Sweden in 1924. It was the nation's third appearance in the sport. Sweden was one of six nations to have competed in each edition of the Olympic modern pentathlon to that point. For the third time, Sweden swept the medals.

Sailing

Four sailors represented Sweden in 1924. It was the nation's fourth appearance in the sport.

Shooting

Nineteen sport shooters represented Sweden in 1924, winning two bronze and two silver medals.

Swimming

Ranks given are within the heat.

 Men

* – Indicates athlete swam in the preliminaries but not in the final race.

 Women

Tennis

 Men

 Women

 Mixed

Water polo

Summary

In its fourth Olympic water polo appearance, Sweden missed the medal podium for the first time.

Roster
 Cletus Andersson
 Erik Andersson
 Vilhelm Andersson
 Nils Backlund
 Theodor Nauman
 Martin Norberg
 Gösta Persson
 E. Skoglund
 N. Skoglund
 Hilmar Wictorin

First round

Quarterfinals

Semifinals

Silver medal semifinals

Bronze medal quarterfinals
 Bye
Bronze medal semifinals

Bronze medal final

Weightlifting

Wrestling

Freestyle wrestling

 Men's

Greco-Roman

 Men's

References

External links
Official Olympic Reports
International Olympic Committee results database

Nations at the 1924 Summer Olympics
1924
1924 in Swedish sport